is a passenger railway station in the town of Ōizumi, Gunma, Japan, operated by the private railway operator Tōbu Railway. It is numbered "TI-44".

Lines
It is also the terminal station of a branch line of the Tōbu Koizumi Line, which terminates at  9.1 kilometers away.

Station layout
The station consists of a single island platform connected to the station building by a footbridge.

Platforms

Adjacent stations

History
Higashi-Koizumi Station opened on December 1, 1941, and elevated to a full passenger station in April 1942. It reverted to a signal stop in 1955, and was not restored as a passenger station until 1977
From 17 March 2012, station numbering was introduced on all Tōbu lines, with Higashi-Koizumi Station becoming "TI-44".

Passenger statistics
In fiscal 2019, the station was used by an average of 1517 passengers daily (boarding passengers only).

Surrounding area
 National Route 354

See also
List of railway stations in Japan

References
 Zenkoku Tetsudo Jijo Daikenkyu  
 Ekisha Saihakken  
 Tetsudo Haisen Ato o Aruku

External links

 Tobu station information 
	

Tobu Koizumi Line
Stations of Tobu Railway
Railway stations in Gunma Prefecture
Railway stations in Japan opened in 1941
Ōizumi, Gunma